The 17th Volunteer Training Regiment "Acqui" is an active unit of the Italian Army based in Capua in Campania. Founded as 17th Infantry Regiment "Acqui" the regiment was part of the Italian army's infantry arm until it became a basic training unit and has been designated a "multi-arms unit" since.

Current structure 
As of 2019 the 17th Volunteer Training Regiment "Acqui" consists of:

  Regimental Command, in Capua
 Command and Logistic Support Company
 1st Battalion "San Martino"
 1st Company "Cefalonia"
 2nd Company "Novara"
 3rd Company "Carso"
 2nd Battalion "Salento"
 4th Company "Falchi"
 5th Company "Pegaso"
 6th Company "Tigre"

External links
Italian Army Website: 17° Reggimento Addestramento Volontari "Acqui"

References

Infantry Regiments of Italy